Sextus Afranius Burrus (born AD 1 in Vasio, Gallia Narbonensis; died AD 62) was a prefect of the Praetorian Guard and was, together with Seneca the Younger, an advisor to the Roman emperor Nero, making him a very powerful man in the early years of Nero's reign.

Agrippina the Younger chose him as Prefect in 51 to secure her son Nero's place as emperor after the death of Claudius. For the first eight years of Nero's rule, Burrus and Nero's former tutor Seneca helped maintain a stable government. Burrus acquiesced to Nero's murder of Agrippina the Younger but lost his influence over Nero anyway. He died in 62, some say from poison.

The cognomen "Burrus" is the Latin version of the name Pyrrhus, king of Epirus.

Sources
 Tacitus Annales 12.42; 14.51
 Suetonius Nero 35.5
  = ILS 1321
 Dio 62.13

References

   

1st-century Romans
AD 1 births
62 deaths
Burrus, Sextus
Praetorian prefects
People from Gallia Narbonensis